Melrose High School may refer to:
 Melrose High School – located at present-day Melrose Elementary School in Melrose, Florida
 Melrose High School (Canberra), Australia
 Melrose High School (Massachusetts), USA
 Melrose High School (Minnesota), USA
 Melrose High School – Melrose, New Mexico
 Melrose High School (Memphis, Tennessee)
 Melrose-Mindoro High School – Melrose, Wisconsin